Johan Brunström and Raven Klaasen were the defending champions but decided not to participate.

Bednarek and Kontinen won the title, defeating Ken Skupski and Neal Skupski in the final, 3–6, 7–6(7–3), [12–10].

Seeds

Draw

Draw

References
 Main Draw

Intersport Heilbronn Open - Doubles
2014 Doubles